This list of theatrical animated feature films consists of animated films produced or released by The Walt Disney Studios, the film division of The Walt Disney Company.

The Walt Disney Studios releases films from Disney-owned and non-Disney owned animation studios. Beginning with Toy Story in 1995, The Walt Disney Studios has also released animated films by Pixar Animation Studios, which Disney would eventually acquire in 2006. In 2019, as part of its acquisition of 21st Century Fox, The Walt Disney Studios acquired Blue Sky Studios (now closed down in 2021), as well as 20th Century Fox Animation (now simply 20th Century Animation) which operates as a label within 20th Century Fox (now 20th Century Studios).

Other studio units have also released films theatrically, namely, Walt Disney Television Animation's Disney MovieToons/Video Premiere unit (later renamed Disneytoon Studios) and the studio's distribution unit, which acquires film rights from outside animation studios to release films under the Walt Disney Pictures, Touchstone Pictures, Miramax and 20th Century Studios film labels.

Films

US releases

Films distributed by Miramax 

The following is a list of films that were released by Miramax Films when the studio was a subsidiary of Disney at the time of release.

International releases

Upcoming

Highest-grossing films

See also

List of Walt Disney Pictures films
List of Walt Disney Animation Studios films
List of Pixar films
List of Disneytoon Studios films
List of Disney Television Animation films
List of Disney live-action adaptations and remakes of Disney animated films
List of 20th Century Studios theatrical animated feature films
List of Blue Sky Studios productions
Distribution brands
List of Disney feature-length home entertainment releases
Disney Vault
Walt Disney Classics

Notes
General notes

Release notes

Studio/production notes

Studio Ghibli films original release dates

References

External links
Walt Disney Animation Studios History

American animated films
Disney animated films
Animation
Lists of American animated films
Walt Disney Animation Studios films
Walt Disney Pictures animated films